Crisscross (2018) is an Indian Bengali-language drama film directed by Birsa Dasgupta which is based on Smaranjit Chakraborty's 2013 novel of the same name. The film is produced by Shrikant Mohta and Mahendra Soni under the banner of SVF Entertainment. It stars Nusrat Jahan, Mimi Chakraborty, Bangladeshi actress Jaya Ahsan, Sohini Sarkar, Priyanka Sarkar.The film was released on 10 August 2018.

Plot
Crisscross is primarily the story of five women from various walks of life. They all live in the city of Kolkata, and none of them are happy. Suzy is a freelance graphic designer who just can't seem to get work, or in the rare occasion when she does, never gets paid on time. She is a single mother with a drug-addict ex-husband, trying to put food on the table and giving her son a good education, even as the wolves and vultures keep circling her day and night. Meher is an aspiring actress trying to remain afloat by doing bit roles here and there, auditioning for good roles and getting humiliated on a daily basis. She has a widowed mother and a sickly brother to take care of, but the money just doesn't seem to come in. Miss Sen is a successful independent businesswoman who seems to be ruthless in her career ambitions – so much so that she has separated from her husband and her daughter. However, her business is weathering a storm, and she has been making some wrong moves, until a shocking revelation explains why. Rupa is a timid middle-class housewife who is constantly abused by her in-laws. While her mother-in-law blames her for not being able to conceive, her husband is always bickering at her. To make matters worse, there's this slimy good-for-nothing brother-in-law, who keeps abusing her mentally and physically by making direct sexual advances. Rupa bears it all, until one day, when she learns that she has a terminal disease. Finally, there's Ira a successful and independent photojournalist, who struggles to strike a balance between her career and a caring but priority-demanding boyfriend who wants to marry her. The stories of each of these women run crisscross, intersecting each other, and in one way or another, affecting each other.

Cast
 Nusrat Jahan as Meher
 Mimi Chakraborty as Ira
 Jaya Ahsan as Miss. Sen
 Sohini Sarkar as Rupa
 Priyanka Sarkar as Suzy
 Ridhima Ghosh as Urna
 Arjun Chakrabarty as Archie
 Gaurav Chakrabarty as Ahan
Mithu Chakrabarty as Meher's Mother
Dolon Roy as Ira's Mother
 Anindita Raychaudhury as Boudi
 Ambarish Bhattacharya as Rupa's Husband
 Mainak Banerjee as Rupa's Brother-in-law
 Phalguni Chatterjee

Soundtrack

The music is composed by JAM8 for Crisscross.

References

External links 
 

2018 films
Films directed by Birsa Dasgupta
Indian drama films
Bengali-language Indian films
2010s Bengali-language films
2018 drama films
Films based on Indian novels